Ooooooohhh... On the TLC Tip is the debut studio album by American girl group TLC, released on February 25, 1992, by LaFace Records. The title of the album comes from the last line of Left Eye's rap on "Ain't 2 Proud 2 Beg".

The album peaked at number 14 on the US Billboard 200 and has been certified quadruple platinum by the Recording Industry Association of America (RIAA), denoting shipments in excess of four million copies in the United States. It is also TLC's third most successful album (after CrazySexyCool and FanMail, respectively), having sold over six million copies worldwide.

Background
TLC signed their first contract with LaFace Records on February 28, 1991 (amended April 3, 1991, with Thomas), and began production on their debut album. For the album, TLC collaborated with Babyface, L.A. Reid, Dallas Austin, Da Funky Bunch, Jermaine Dupri, and Marley Marl, who helped Lopes with the songwriting. Production finished in December 1991.

Critical reception

Ken Tucker of Entertainment Weekly praised the effort as well as the group and its message, calling TLC "a perfect pop group for the times." In a fairly positive review, Steve Huey of AllMusic states that "although it's uneven, the best moments of On the TLC Tip deserved their popularity, and set the stage for the group's blockbuster success the next time out."

Commercial performance
Ooooooohhh... On the TLC Tip debuted at number 105 on the US Billboard 200, and reached number 14 on the chart and number three on the Top R&B/Hip-Hop Albums chart. It was certified quadruple platinum by the Recording Industry Association of America (RIAA) on May 1, 1996, and by October 2003, it had sold 2.5 million copies in the United States. The album had sold over six million copies worldwide as of December 2011.

Track listing

Notes
  signifies a co-producer
 Most digital platforms list "Das Da Way We Like 'Em" under the alternate title "Way We Like 'Em"

Sample credits
 "Ain't 2 Proud 2 Beg" samples "Escape-ism" by James Brown, "Jungle Boogie" by Kool & the Gang, "School Boy Crush" by Average White Band, "Fly, Robin, Fly" by Silver Convention, and "Take Me to the Mardi Gras" by Bob James.
 "Shock Dat Monkey" samples "Get Me Back on Time, Engine Number 9" by Wilson Pickett, "Funky Drummer" by James Brown, and "Funky President (People It's Bad)" by James Brown.
 "Hat 2 da Back" samples "Big Ole Butt" by LL Cool J and "What Makes You Happy" by KC and the Sunshine Band.
 "Das da Way We Like 'Em" samples "Think (About It)" by Lyn Collins and "UFO" by ESG.
 "Bad by Myself" samples "Welcome to the Terrordome" by Public Enemy, "Peter Piper" by Run-DMC, "Last Night Changed It All (I Really Had a Ball)" by Esther Williams, and "Peace Is Not the Word to Play" by Main Source.
 "This Is How It Should Be Done" samples "We're a Winner" by the Impressions and "I Know You Got Soul" by Eric B. & Rakim.
 "Depend on Myself" samples "Son of Shaft" and "Humpin'" by the Bar-Kays.

Personnel
Credits adapted from the liner notes of Ooooooohhh... On the TLC Tip.

Musicians

 Dallas Austin – arrangements ; shouts ; keyboards, drum programming, bass, guitar
 Rick Sheppard – programming ; sampling 
 Debra Killings – background vocals 
 TLC – background vocals ; shouts 
 Kevin Wales – shouts 
 Eloc – shouts 
 Fabian Ford – shouts 
 Babyface – keyboards 
 L.A. Reid – drums ; percussion 
 Kayo – bass ; background vocals 
 Donald Parks – programming 
 X-Man – scratching, sampling 
 Daryl Simmons – additional vocal arrangements (as DeRock Simmons) ; keyboards 
 Marley Marl – arrangements 
 Darren Lighty – keyboards, programming 
 Mary Brown – background vocals 
 Marsha McClurkin – background vocals 
 Jermaine Dupri – arrangements, vocal arrangements, all instruments, programming 
 Dionne Farris – vocal arrangements, background vocals 
 Seldon "Big Wally" Henderson – additional strings 
 Tye-V – background vocals

Technical

 Dallas Austin – production, mixing 
 Dave Way – mixing ; mix engineering
 L.A. Reid – production ; mixing ; executive production
 Babyface – production ; executive production
 Daryl Simmons – co-production ; production 
 Kayo – co-production ; production 
 Marley Marl – production, mixing ; mix engineering
 Jermaine Dupri – production, mixing 
 Da Funky Bunch – production 
 Darin Prindle – recording engineering
 Jim "Z" Zumpano – recording engineering, mix engineering assistance
 John Pace – recording engineering
 Alvin Speights – recording engineering, mix engineering
 Frank Heller – recording engineering
 Steve "Stizz" S'berg – recording engineering assistance
 Brandi Parisi – recording engineering assistance
 John Rogers – recording engineering assistance
 Mitch Eaton – recording engineering assistance
 Phil Tan – recording engineering assistance, mix engineering assistance
 Matt Still – recording engineering assistance, mix engineering assistance
 Yvette Whitaker – album coordination
 Constance Armstrong – album coordination
 Herb Powers Jr. – mastering

Artwork
 Calvin Lowery – art direction, design
 Michael Lavine – photography
 Davett Singletary – art coordination
 Perri Reid – art coordination
 TLC – album concept

Charts

Weekly charts

Year-end charts

Certifications

Ooooooohhh... On the Video Tip

Oooooooohhh... On the Video Tip is a compilation video album by TLC, containing all the music videos made for the group's debut album, as well as making-of features for the videos "Ain't 2 Proud 2 Beg", "Hat 2 da Back", "Baby-Baby-Baby", "Get It Up", "What About Your Friends" and "Sleigh Ride". Additional material includes, interviews, live performances and specially filmed segues. The compilation peaked at number seven on Billboards Top Music Videos chart.

Track listing

Bonus
 Interactive Menu
 "Sleigh Ride" (music video) – 4:00
 "Hat 2 da Back" (music video) – 4:10
 "Get It Up" (music video) – 4:10
 "Baby-Baby-Baby" (live) – 4:30

Charts

References

1992 debut albums
Albums produced by Babyface (musician)
Albums produced by Dallas Austin
Albums produced by Jermaine Dupri
Albums produced by L.A. Reid
Albums produced by Marley Marl
LaFace Records albums
TLC (group) albums